House Calls with Dr. Phil is an American television documentary series that aired on CBS from August 18 to September 15, 2021. In the series, doctor Phil McGraw travels across the United States to visit families in need of his help.

Episodes

References

External links
 

2020s American documentary television series
2021 American television series debuts
2021 American television series endings
CBS original programming
English-language television shows
Television series by CBS Studios